The State University of New York College at Old Westbury (SUNY at Old Westbury) is a public college in Old Westbury, New York, with portions in the neighboring town of Jericho, New York. It enrolls just over 5,000 students.

History
The State University of New York College at Old Westbury was founded in 1965 by the State University of New York Board of Trustees.  It began in 1968 at Planting Fields, the former Coe Estate and arboretum in Oyster Bay, New York.  In 1971, the college moved to its present Old Westbury site in Nassau County, Long Island – an estate, known as "Broad Hollow," formerly owned by agriculturist, industrialist, sportsman and philanthropist F. Ambrose Clark.

Academics

There are over 50 degree programs available at the college.

Of the college's 166 full-time professors, approximately 80% hold the highest degree in their discipline. Eight members of the faculty have been named Distinguished Teaching or Service Professors by the State University of New York, which are among the highest ranks available in the university system.

Old Westbury faculty members are engaged in research, publication, and public service.  In the 2009–10 academic year, the college faculty earned approximately $1,345,000 in research and service funding from such sources as the National Science Foundation, the National Endowment for the Humanities, and the National Institutes for Health.

Academic offerings are housed in four schools.
 The School of Arts and Sciences is home to the following departments: American Studies/Media & Communications; Biological Sciences; Chemistry and Physics; English; History and Philosophy; Mathematics, Computer and Information Science; Modern Languages; Politics, Economics and Law; Industrial and Labor Relations; Psychology; Sociology, which offers the BS in criminology, and the BS and the BA in sociology; and Visual Arts.
 The School of Business is composed of the Accounting, Taxation and Business Law Department; and the Management, Marketing and Finance Department. They currently offer an M.S. in accounting degree which is fully online.
 The School of Education in 2006 was accredited by the National Council for the Accreditation of Teacher Education. 
 The School of Professional Studies offers evening, online, hybrid, and weekend courses. Its programs include two baccalaureate degrees, a Bachelor of Professional Studies and a Bachelor of Science in liberal arts and general studies.

The college's current president is Timothy E. Sams.

Four-day school week
The college's school week runs on a Monday–Thursday schedule, instead of Monday–Friday as at most colleges and universities.  Students taking science courses usually (but not always) have labs scheduled on Fridays.

The college also has a "dry campus" policy – no alcohol allowed.

Student government
The Old Westbury Student Government Association consists of an executive board which includes a president, vice president, treasurer, secretary, public relations officer, executive staff officer and a governor of social affairs who is responsible for managing clubs and organizations on campus as well as organizing student activities. The student government also has a student senate and a judicial court.

Athletics
SUNY Old Westbury teams participate as a member of the National Collegiate Athletic Association's Division III. The Panthers are a member of the Skyline Conference. Men's sports include baseball, basketball, cross country, golf, soccer and volleyball; while women's sports include basketball, cross country, lacrosse, soccer, softball and volleyball.

Athletic facilities

The F. Ambrose Clark Physical Education & Recreation Center, aka the Clark Athletic Center, houses a 25-meter swimming pool; a gymnasium with seating for 2,000; a strength and conditioning facility; and an aerobic workout room with physical fitness accessories.

The Clark Center is a venue for the Nassau County, New York high school men's basketball playoffs as well as some women's tournament games. The events are shown on local Cablevision TV outlets News 12 Long Island and Telecare. Other Nassau high school basketball events are staged at the C.W. Post Campus of Long Island University's Pratt Center, north of the Clark Center in the neighboring region of Brookville, New York.

The neighboring Jackie Robinson Athletic Complex, dedicated in 2006, adjoins the Clark Center. It includes a baseball stadium and softball field.  The baseball stadium seatings more than 1,000 fans, and a press box is available for game announcers and media personnel.

The college features two soccer fields, eight tennis courts, and two outdoor recreational basketball courts.  Runners in cross country competition train on European-styled courses that traverse Old Westbury's  wooded campus.

Greek life

Notable alumni
Craig S. Harris, Noted avant garde jazz musician
John McTiernan, Producer: Predator, Die Hard 1 & 2, Thomas Crown Affair and Hunt for Red October
David Liederman, Founder David's Cookies
Andrea Navedo, Actress: Jane the Virgin, Superfast! and Bright
Kool Moe Dee, Grammy Award-winning rapper, first rapper to perform at the Grammys
Kevin J. Greene, lawyer

References

External links
 Official website
 Official athletics website

 
State University of New York at Old Westbury
Old Westbury
Universities and colleges on Long Island
Public liberal arts colleges in the United States
Universities and colleges in Nassau County, New York
Educational institutions established in 1965
1965 establishments in New York (state)